Maynard '61 is an album by jazz trumpeter Maynard Ferguson featuring tracks recorded in late 1960 and early 1961 and originally released on the Roulette label.

Reception

Scott Yanow of AllMusic states, "Maynard Ferguson led his finest orchestra during his period with Roulette". For the CD reissue (Roulette CDP 7939002), The Penguin Guide to Jazz praised the brighter sound of the CD and picked Ferguson's solo on the bonus track "Go East, Young Man" as a highlight.

Track listing
 "Olé" (Slide Hampton) – 6:30
 "New Blue" (Hampton) – 5:42
 "Blues for Kapp" (Marty Paich) – 5:10
 "Ultimate Rejection" (Joe Farrell) – 6:15
 "The Pharaoh" (Hampton) – 7:41
 "Goodbye" (Gordon Jenkins) – 4:45
Recorded in New York City on October 14, 1960 (track 1), October 20, 1960 (tracks 2 & 5), December 21, 1960 (tracks 4) and January 20, 1961 (tracks 3 & 6)

Personnel 
Maynard Ferguson – trumpet, trombone
Bill Berry (tracks 3 & 6), Rolf Ericson (tracks 3, 4 & 6), Chet Ferretti, Rick Kiefer (tracks 1, 2, 4 & 5), Jerry Tyree (tracks 1, 2 & 5) – trumpet
Slide Hampton (tracks 1, 2, 4 & 5), Kenny Rupp, Ray Winslow (tracks 3 & 6) – trombone
Lanny Morgan – alto saxophone, flute
Willie Maiden – tenor saxophone, clarinet
Joe Farrell – tenor saxophone, soprano saxophone, flute
Frank Hittner – baritone saxophone, bass clarinet
Jaki Byard – piano
Charlie Sanders – bass 
Rufus Jones – drums
Joe Farrell, Slide Hampton, Willie Maiden, Marty Paich, Don Sebesky – arrangers

References 

1961 albums
Maynard Ferguson albums
Roulette Records albums
Albums produced by Teddy Reig
Albums arranged by Slide Hampton
Albums arranged by Marty Paich
Albums arranged by Don Sebesky